Kali Christ (born November 9, 1991) is a Canadian speed skater. She primarily skates in the middle distances of 1000 m, 1500m, as well as the mass start event. Christ represented Canada in both these events at the 2014 Winter Olympics in Sochi as well as the team pursuit event.

Career

2018 Winter Olympics
Christ qualified to compete for Canada at the 2018 Winter Olympics.

References

External links

1991 births
Sportspeople from Regina, Saskatchewan
Canadian female speed skaters
Living people
Speed skaters at the 2014 Winter Olympics
Speed skaters at the 2018 Winter Olympics
Olympic speed skaters of Canada
World Single Distances Speed Skating Championships medalists
21st-century Canadian women